This is a list of American films released in 1967.

In the Heat of the Night won the Academy Award for Best Picture.

A-D

E-H

I-P

R-Z

Documentaries

Other

See also
 1967 in the United States

External links

1967 films at the Internet Movie Database
List of 1967 box office number-one films in the United States

1967
Films
Lists of 1967 films by country or language